There are 20 castles in the county of Cheshire in North West England.

Introduction
Cheshire is one of the historic counties of England and its historic boundaries are different from the modern county lines. Some castles that were formerly in Cheshire are now in Greater Manchester. In addition, Warrington Castle is historically a part of Lancashire but is within the current boundaries of Cheshire. Before the Norman conquest of England began in 1066, defensive sites in England were communal, such as Anglo-Saxon burhs built as a defence against the Danes. Castles were popularised in England by the Normans – although a few sites in the south-east pre-dating the Norman conquest – and were owned by the feudal lords. The primary purpose of a castle was military: to be used as a base of operations and to control the surrounding areas. A castle was considered to be a stamp of authority over the population of an area, and a status symbol. Some would have acted as centres of trade and administration for a manor.

Castles can take several forms. The most common is the motte-and-bailey which consists of a motte (a mound) – surmounted by a keep or tower – connected to a bailey, an outer enclosure where the barracks and workshops were located. Other types of castle in Cheshire are ringworks and fortified manor houses. Ringworks are similar to motte-and-bailey castles but lack the motte; although contemporary with motte-and-baileys, they are an uncommon form of fortification. A ringwork may have been built rather than a motte-and-bailey because the soil was too thin to provide a proper motte or simply because of the preference of the builder. A fortified manor house was the administrative centre of a manor – a division of land in medieval England – and was usually the home of the local lord. Fortified manor houses are considered castles because they often had battlements or crenellations.

Due to its border with Wales, Cheshire played an important role in defending England against the Welsh. Many castles were built along the border, and 8 of the 20 castles in Cheshire are within  of the Welsh border. Castles along the border were constructed when the Norman invasion of Wales was slowed by Welsh opposition; when conquest was swift, there was less need for fortifications. Compared to north Wales, relatively few castles are found in Cheshire since many, such as Holt Castle, were built on the western side of the River Dee. Most of these castles were motte-and-baileys and were originally of turf and timber construction, although they were sometimes later replaced by stone structures if a long-term castle was needed. Away from the borders, baronial castles were built in Cheshire and were a status symbol. The castles in Cheshire were built over a period of several centuries, with the earliest in 1070 and the latest in the 15th century. Most, 12 out of 20, were built between 1070 and the end of the 12th century. Of the three castles in Cheshire known to have been built after the 13th century, they are either tower houses or fortified manor houses; this type of structure was more important as a feudal residence than a military structure and reflects the national trend of castles after the 13th century being used as a symbol of authority rather than primarily military.

Most of the castles are in a ruinous state, having been abandoned after they fulfilled their military purpose. The remains are often protected by law: 11 sites are Scheduled Monuments, and 5 are listed buildings. A Scheduled Ancient Monument is a "nationally important" archaeological site or historic building, given protection against unauthorised change. As well as the 20 known castles in Cheshire, historian Mike Salter in his 2001 gazetteer of the castles in Cheshire and Lancashire lists Mud Hill in Coddington and Peel Hall near Manley as possible sites of castles.

List of castles

Alternative names
Some of the castles in the list have more than one name. Where this is the case, the alternative names are listed here.
Also known as Delves Hall
Also known as Castle Cob
Also known as Buckingham Palace and Buckingham Castle
Also known as Castle Hill
Also known as The Mount, The Motte, and Moat Hill

See also

List of castles in England
List of castles in Greater Manchester
List of scheduled monuments in Cheshire (1066–1539)
Mow Cop Castle – an 18th-century folly
Peckforton Castle – a 19th-century house
Welsh Marches

References

Bibliography

Further reading

History of Cheshire

Castles
Cheshire